The Tepehuan shiner (Cyprinella alvarezdelvillari) is a species of cyprinid fish endemic to Mexico. It was described as a new species from a stream in the headwaters of Nazas River in Arroyo del Péñon Blanco, upstream of Peñón Blanco, Durango. The specific name honors Dr. José Alvarez del Villar, the "founder of modern Mexican ichthyology".

The Tepehuan shiner is a small species that can grow up to  standard length, but is usually smaller, less than  SL.

References

Cyprinella
Freshwater fish of Mexico
Endemic fish of Mexico
Taxa named by Salvador Contreras-Balderas & 
Taxa named by María de Lourdes Lozano-Vilano
Fish described in 1994
Taxonomy articles created by Polbot
Mexican Plateau
Fauna of the Sierra Madre Occidental